Virginia's 78th House of Delegates district elects one of 100 seats in the Virginia House of Delegates, the lower house of the state's bicameral legislature. District 78 represents part of the city of Chesapeake in Hampton Roads, the southern coastal region of Virginia. The seat is currently held by Republican Jay Leftwich.

Electoral history

2013 
On November 6, 2013, three candidates vied for the open seat in the 78th district, vacated in August of that year when incumbent John Cosgrove won a special election to the state senate. In the House of Delegates race, Republican Jay Leftwich, a lawyer and chair of the local school board, prevailed with 57% of the vote; the Democrat  Linda Bryant earned 39% and Libertarian Dan Foster trailed both.

District officeholders

References

Chesapeake, Virginia
Virginia House of Delegates districts